Xenorhabdus doucetiae  is a bacterium from the genus of Xenorhabdus which has been isolated from the nematode Steinernema diaprepesi from Martinique in France.

References

Further reading

External links
Type strain of Xenorhabdus doucetiae at BacDive -  the Bacterial Diversity Metadatabase

Bacteria described in 2006